Panama was formerly a department of Colombia and used overprints of Colombian stamps from 1878 until it gained independence in 1903.

In 1904, Panama was one of the few countries to issue a stamp for the Avis de réception service.

Telegraph stamps
Panama issued a number of telegraph stamps between 1917 and 1935, most of which were postage or revenue stamps overprinted for telegraphic use. Colombia also issued telegraph stamps for use in Panama before independence but they are not known in used form.

See also
Postage stamps and postal history of Colombia
Postage stamps and postal history of the Canal Zone

References

External links

 Colombia-Panama Philatelic Study Group

Philately of Panama